The Democratic Regional Union (Dimokratiki Periferiaki Enosi) is a Greek political party. It is led by Mihalis Haralambidis.

The party was founded in March 2000 as a split from the Panhellenic Socialist Movement.

Electoral results

External links
Democratic Regional Union Party website

Social democratic parties in Greece
Political parties established in 2000
2000 establishments in Greece
2000 in Greek politics